Colerain High School is a public high school located near Cincinnati, Ohio.  It is part of the Northwest Local School District. The high school is located in Colerain Township, about 14 miles northwest of downtown Cincinnati. The original school opened in 1924 under the name Colerain Centralized School at 4700 and 4850 Poole Road and is now Colerain Elementary School and Colerain Middle School. Today's Colerain High School opened in 1964 at its newer address, 8801 Cheviot Road. It is the largest public school in the Colerain area in terms of enrollment and building size, with over 2,200 students currently attending CHS in two buildings on campus, the main school building and the Career Center building. Colerain is among the largest schools in the Cincinnati area and in the state of Ohio.

Athletics

Colerain competes in the Greater Miami Conference in all conference sports except boys' volleyball.

Ohio High School Athletic Association State Championships

 Football – 2004
 Girls' cross-country – 1997,1998,1999,2000
 Boys' cross-country – 1978

Notable alumni

 B. J. Askew, former NFL player
 Darrian Beavers, current NFL player
 Joe Bolden, former college football player, American football coach
 Eugene Clifford, former NFL player
 Dominick Goodman, former Arena Football League player
 Eric Kattus, former NFL player
 Roger McDowell, former MLB player and coach
 Tegray Scales, current NFL player
 Mary Lee Tracy, artistic gymnastics coach

Notable faculty / coaches
 Kerry Coombs, American football coach

References

External links
Colerain High School Website
Colerain High School history page on Colerain Alumni Website

High schools in Hamilton County, Ohio
Public high schools in Ohio
1924 establishments in Ohio
Educational institutions established in 1924